Harrild may refer to:

 Robert Harrild, printing pioneer
 Harrild & Sons, British manufacturer of printing machinery and supplies